Angela Keep (born 1981) is an Australian actress.

Career 
Keep's television debut on the sitcom Hey Dad..!. She played Jenny Kelly, taking over the role from Sarah Monahan, on the show for two seasons, from 1993 until 1994. In 1997, she starred in children's mini series, Spellbinder: Land of the Dragon Lord and in the drama Breakers (1998–99).  Keep also appeared in Home and Away where she played Skye Patterson.

She has had minor roles in some films, including Garage Days, released in 2002 and in Ned, a comedy satire of the life of Ned Kelly, released in 2003. She has also had a guest role in the television series Beastmaster in the episode "The Minotaur".

Most recently Keep appeared in the Australian television drama series, All Saints, where she played Polly Spicer.

References

1981 births
Australian film actresses
Australian television actresses
Living people
Australian child actresses